Bahrain competed at the 2008 Summer Olympics in Beijing, China. The country sent a total of 15 competitors to the Games, competing in athletics, swimming and shooting,. This constituted Bahrain's largest Olympic delegation to date. Among the country's representatives is Maryam Yusuf Jamal, reigning world champion in the women's 1,500 metre run. Rakia Al Gassra was the country's flagbearer at the Games' opening ceremony. In athletics, Rashid Ramzi was originally awarded the gold medal in men's 1,500 meters (Bahrain's first Olympic medal) but it was later stripped due to doping violation.

Athletics

Men

* Rashid Ramzi was originally awarded the gold medal in men's 1,500 meters (Bahrain's first Olympic medal) but it was later stripped due to doping violation.

Women

Key
Note–Ranks given for track events are within the athlete's heat only
Q = Qualified for the next round
q = Qualified for the next round as a fastest loser or, in field events, by position without achieving the qualifying target
NR = National record
N/A = Round not applicable for the event
Bye = Athlete not required to compete in round

Shooting

Salman Zaman will be the country's only representative in shooting.

Men

Swimming

Bahrain will be represented by two swimmers at the Beijing Games.

Men

Women

References

Nations at the 2008 Summer Olympics
2008
Olympics